Foy is a village of Wallonia in the municipality of Bastogne, district of Noville, located in the province of Luxembourg in the Ardennes, Belgium.

Background
Foy is in the Ardennes Forest region, an area of more than 11,000 square kilometers. It is largely in what today is Wallonia, the French-speaking area of southern Belgium, but it extends into France, Germany, and Luxembourg.

Battle of the Bulge
In World War II, Foy was heavily occupied by German forces during the Battle of the Bulge. The U.S. 101st Airborne Division held the Bois Jacques just outside town. After being relieved by General George S. Patton's U.S. Third Army, the 101st retook the town.

On January 2, 1945, the 1st Canadian Parachute Battalion was assigned to patrolling duties and to aid defense. It took part in the general advance passing the towns of Aye, Marche, Foy and Bande, with its participation ended after the Allies captured Bande. During the operation, the unit sustained a few casualties in active combat. This was the only Canadian unit to take part in the Ardennes offensive. The role of the Canadians was small compared to that of the Americans, acting as more of a substitute for the 101st when that unit was called elsewhere.

A monument to the American paratroopers was built in 2004 at the edge of the Bois Jacques, south of Foy.

References

Bastogne
Populated places in Luxembourg (Belgium)